The Triumph of Love is a 2001 romantic comedy film, based on Marivaux's 1732 play of the same name. It was directed by Clare Peploe, produced by her husband Bernardo Bertolucci, and stars Mira Sorvino and Ben Kingsley.

In an unidentified country in 18th century Europe, a usurper's daughter (Mira Sorvino) has inherited the throne and feels guilty about her family's crimes. She learns that the Queen gave birth to a prince and the rightful heir, Agis (Jay Rodan), who was secretly sent to live with the great philosopher Hermocrates. Agis has been taught to hate her and the entire female sex, and to reject all love. After gaining information from one of Hermocrates' servants, she goes to see Agis for herself and finds him bathing in a lake in the forest. She falls in love with him at first sight, but he is kept in seclusion by Hermocrates (Ben Kingsley) and his sister Leontine (Fiona Shaw) to protect him from her. She wishes to gain Agis' love in return and marry him so that they may share the throne, but to get close enough to Agis, she must embark on a series of bribes, deceptions, and seductions.

Characters
The Princess  The daughter of a usurper who falls in love with Agis, the rightful heir to the throne. Agis has been taught to hate her above all else, so she disguises herself as a young male scholar named Phocion and attempts to deceive both Hermocrates and his sister Leontine, all the while trying to get closer to Agis and make him fall in love with her.

Hermocrates  A great philosopher who hates the usurper princess and has been teaching Agis to despise her and the entire female sex and scorn the notion of 'love'. Discovering that 'Phocion' is really a woman, the princess (now calling herself 'Aspasie') tells him that she has fallen in love with him, and seduces him so that he will allow her to stay at his house (and therefore give her more time with Agis).

Leontine  Hermocrates' sister who is attempting several experiments to create electricity. Throughout most of the movie she believes that the princess is a man named Phocion. She is the first person that Phocion/the princess seduces, and is devastated upon discovering that she has been tricked. Occasionally, Leontine imagines that she can see an audience watching her, a reference to the fact that the movie is based on a play.

Agis  A handsome young man who is the rightful heir to the throne. He has been taught to hate women (the princess especially) and to reject all love. He becomes friends with Phocion, and is delighted to finally have someone to talk too. 'Phocion' soon reveals herself as a woman (but not as the princess) and Agis already treasures their friendship too much to hate her now based on her sex. He becomes more and more confused about his feelings and soon realises that he's falling in love with her.

Corine  The princess's lady-in-waiting who assists the princess any way she can. She also disguises herself as a man named Hermidas, and infiltrates Hermocrates' home along with the princess. Corine is invaluable to the princess, as both a loyal friend and as an accomplice. It is implied that Corine and Harlequin are slightly attracted to each other.

Harlequin  One of Hermocrates' servants who catches the princess and Corine climbing over the wall and overhears them talking about their plan. The princess bribes him into aiding them and keeping their identities secret. It is implied that he likes Corine, for when 'Phocion's good looks are complimented, he adds that 'they are both attractive', and is later seen playfully giving Corine a foot rub.

Dimas  Hermocrates' gardener. Harlequin reveals the women's identities to him so that they will both be paid (to which Corine reacts angrily). Hermocrates had asked Dimas to spy on Phocion/Aspasie to discover her true intentions. Now also bribed by the princess, Dimas gives Hermocrates false information, leading Hermocrates to believe that Aspasie really does love him.

External links

2001 films
Films set in the 18th century
2001 romantic comedy films
Paramount Vantage films
Italian films based on plays
Italian romantic comedy films
British films based on plays
British romantic comedy films
German films based on plays
German romantic comedy films
English-language German films
English-language Italian films
2000s British films
2000s German films